Jaam-e Jam may refer to:
Jaam-e Jam (mythology) or the Cup of Jamshid, a cup of divination in Persian mythology
Jaam-e-Jam (TV channel), an American-based Persian TV station
Jam-e Jam (newspaper), an Iranian newspaper